The First Union 400 was a NASCAR Winston Cup Series stock car race held annually from 1951 to 1996 at the North Wilkesboro Speedway in Wilkes County, North Carolina. It was the first of two Winston Cup Series races held annually (with the autumn's Tyson Holly Farms 400) at North Wilkesboro Speedway before the track was abandoned in 1996. The race was normally held in late March or early April.

Past winners

1963: Race shortened due to rain.
1974: Race shortened due to energy crisis.
1990: Bodine's lone Winston Cup victory and last win for Buick; finish disputed due to a scoring error.

Multiple winners (drivers)

Multiple winners (manufacturers)

References

External links
 

Former NASCAR races
NASCAR races at North Wilkesboro Speedway